Indios de Guantánamo (English: Guantánamo Indians) is a baseball team in the Cuban National Series. Based in the easternmost Cuban province of Guantánamo, the Indios have had uneven results, though they advanced to the playoffs in three straight years from 1997 to 1999. The team has never won any championship.

Roster

Notable players
 Giorgi Díaz (pitcher)
 Osvaldo Duvergel (pitcher)
 Dalier Hinojosa (pitcher)
 Alfonso Ilivanes (pitcher)
 Agustín Lescaille (first base)
 Oscar Rodríguez (outfield)
 Andrés Telemaco (second base)

References

Baseball teams in Cuba
Guantánamo